Giulio Cesare is an opera by Handel first performed in 1724. Other uses:

Julius Caesar, called Giulio Cesare in Italian
Giulio Cesare Martinengo ( – 1613), composer and teacher of the late Renaissance and early Venetian School
Giulio Cesare la Galla (1576–1624), professor of philosophy at the Collegio Romano and opponent of heliocentrism
Giulio Cesare Vanini (1585–1619), pen name of Lucilio Vanini, a free-thinker somewhat comparable to  Bruno
Italian battleship Giulio Cesare, a Conte di Cavour-class ship that served in both World Wars and in two navies
SS Giulio Cesare, an Italian ocean liner from 1923 to 1944
MS Giulio Cesare, an Italian ocean liner from 1950 to 1973

See also
Cesare (disambiguation)
Julius Caesar (disambiguation)

Human name disambiguation pages